James Madison Harvey (September 21, 1833 – April 15, 1894) was a United States senator from Kansas and fifth Governor of Kansas.

Born near Salt Sulphur Springs, Virginia (now West Virginia), Harvey attended common schools in Indiana, Illinois, and Iowa.  He married Charlotte Richardson Cutter and they had nine children.

Harvey became a civil engineer and headed west as a prospector to Pike's Peak in 1859 as a Fifty-Niner.  After meeting several discouraged miners along the way, Harvey decided to settle instead in Kansas Territory, so he acquired a plot of land in Riley County near Fort Riley and engaged in agricultural pursuits. From 1861 to 1864, he served with the Union Army during the Civil War, advancing to the rank of captain in the 4th Kansas Infantry, which failed to complete organization and was consolidated with other recruits to form the 10th Kansas Infantry.  He attained the rank of captain, commanding the 14th Regiment, Kansas State Militia.

Harvey was elected to the Kansas House of Representatives, 1865–1866, and then elected to the Kansas Senate in 1867–1868. He was Governor of Kansas for two terms, serving from 1868 to 1872, and then elected as a Republican to the U.S. Senate to fill the vacancy caused by the resignation of Alexander Caldwell, where he served from February 12, 1874, to March 3, 1877.

After his U.S. Senate term, Harvey worked as a government surveyor in New Mexico, Utah, Nevada, and Oklahoma, before returning to Kansas in 1890 to resume agricultural pursuits. Harvey County, Kansas, was named for him.

Harvey died near Junction City, Kansas, in 1894. Interment was in Highland Cemetery, Junction City.

References

External links

 Retrieved on 2008-02-14
Governor's papers
James Madison Harvey biography from "Kansas: a cyclopedia of state history, embracing events, institutions, industries, counties, cities, towns, prominent persons, etc.", 1912
James Madison Harvey biography from "A Standard History of Kansas and Kansans", 1918

National Governors Association
The Political Graveyard
Publications concerning Kansas Governor Harvey's administration available via the KGI Online Library

1833 births
1894 deaths
People from Monroe County, West Virginia
Union Army officers
Republican Party members of the Kansas House of Representatives
Republican Party Kansas state senators
Republican Party governors of Kansas
Republican Party United States senators from Kansas
19th-century American politicians